Hyperolius obscurus is a species of frog in the family Hyperoliidae. It is a poorly known species known only from its holotype collected from Sandoa, in Kasai Province, south-western Democratic Republic of the Congo, near the border with Angola.  Common name Kasai reed frog has been proposed for it.

Description
The head is rather large and broad, with blunt snout. The body is slender. The dorsum is uniform brown. The flanks, ventrum, and limbs have fine dark punctuation.

Habitat and conservation
Hyperolius obscurus is a very poorly known species, with no information on its habitat, ecology, or population status. Threats to it are unknown. It is not known to occur in any protected areas.

References

obscurus
Frogs of Africa
Amphibians of the Democratic Republic of the Congo
Endemic fauna of the Democratic Republic of the Congo
Taxa named by Raymond Laurent
Amphibians described in 1943
Taxonomy articles created by Polbot
Southern Congolian forest–savanna mosaic